Susan Brown Snook (born 1962) is the fifth bishop of the Diocese of San Diego in The Episcopal Church.  Following her ordination as priest in 2003, she served several parishes in the Diocese of Arizona.  In 2017, she became canon in the Diocese of Oklahoma for church growth and development.  On June 15, 2019, she was consecrated and installed as bishop in St. Paul's Cathedral in San Diego, California.  She is the first woman to lead the diocese, which includes 43 churches in Southern California and Arizona.

References

1962 births
Living people
Episcopal bishops of San Diego